The following is a list of political parties registered at the Ministry of Interior, Spain, from 1976-2002.

Note that:

 The Ministry does not appear to remove registrations if parties become inactive or are dissolved, and many of the groups no longer exist.
 Some of the groups were actually electoral alliances formed to contest a specific election.
 Some of the groups are regional affiliates or branches of a national party.
 Some of the organizations are actually the youth wings of larger political parties.
 Parties are listed by Spanish name, English name, by city, and in chronological order.
Unión Regional Andaluza (Andalusian Regional Union), Cádiz, 1977-02-09
Democracia Cristiana Andaluza (Andalusian Christian Democracy), Cádiz, 1977-11-08
Unión Social Democráta de Andalucía (Social Democratic Union of Andalusia), Puerto Real, 1977-11-22
Partido Acción Democrática de Andalucía (Democratic Action Party of Andalusia), San Fernando, 1982-08-18
Unidad Puertorrealeña, Puerto Real, 1987-04-22
Leales Conileños, Conil de la Frontera,  1990-05-25
Independientes Portuenses, El Puerto de Santa Maria, 1991-03-11
Jerezanos por Jerez,  Jerez de la Frontera, 1991-03-26
Partido Independientes Isleños, San Fernando, 1991-04-08
Roteños Unidos, Rota, 1991-04-11
Colectivo Ciudadano, Chiclana de la Frontera, 1993-01-18
Iniciativa Rural Independiente, Jerez de la Frontera, 1994-06-22
Sanluqueños Independientes, Sanlucar de Barrameda, 1994-06-22
Bloque Ciudadano Puertorrealeño, Puerto Real, 1994-07-20
Cádiz Agrupación Democrática Independiente, Cádiz, 1995-01-10
Independientes Barbateños, Barbate, 1995-01-10
Independientes Barreños - 2000 (P.i.BA - 2000), Los Barrios, 1995-01-17
Partido Independiente de Valle del Guardiaro, San Roque, 1995-01-27
Unidad por los Barrios, Los Barrios, 1995-02-08
Unidad Ciudadana Portuense, El Puerto de Santa Maria, 1995-02-14
Movimiento de Renovación Local, Jerez de la Frontera, 1995-03-10
Unión Linense Independiente, La Linea de la Concepción, 1995-03-10
Agrupación de Socialistas Independientes de Arcos, Arcos de la Frontera, 1995-03-16
Alternativa Linense, La Linea de la Concepción, 1995-03-30
Partido Positivista Cristiano, Algeciras, 1995-04-17

Cadiz
Province of Cádiz